Omar Imeri (born 13 December 1999) is a professional footballer who plays as a winger for Turkish club Bodrumspor. Born in Macedonia, Imeri is a youth international for Albania.

Club career
On 7 September 2020, Imeri signed a professional contract with Antalyaspor. Imeri made his professional debut with Antalyaspor in a 5-1 Süper Lig win over İstanbul Başakşehir on 24 October 2020.

International career
Born in North Macedonia, Imeri is of Albanian descent. He represented the North Macedonia U21s once, and switched to represent the Albania U21.

References

External links
 
 

1999 births
Footballers from Skopje
Albanians in North Macedonia
Living people
Albanian footballers
Albania youth international footballers
Macedonian footballers
North Macedonia youth international footballers
Association football wingers
KF Shkupi players
KF Shkëndija players
Antalyaspor footballers
Süper Lig players
Macedonian First Football League players
TFF First League players
TFF Second League players
Albanian expatriate footballers
Albanian expatriate sportspeople in Turkey
Macedonian expatriate footballers
Macedonian expatriate sportspeople in Turkey
Expatriate footballers in Turkey